Willie Devale Kemp (born January 1, 1987) is an American professional basketball player who last played for Keravnos of the Cypriot Division A.

Playing career

High school 
Named 2006 Tennessee's Class AA Mr. Basketball ... Also named The Jackson Sun All-West Tennessee Player of the Year ... Averaged 18.8 points, 5.4 rebounds and 7.7 assists in helping lead Bolivar Central to a 29-11 overall record and a spot in the Class AA state quarterfinals ... Led Bolivar Central to a 117-25 record in his four varsity seasons ... Scored over 1,900 points and dished out over 800 assists in his prep career ... Helped lead Bolivar Central to back-to-back Tennessee Class AA state titles in 2004 and 2005 ... Named Class AA Tournament MVP in 2005 ... Was a Tennessee Class AA Mr. Basketball finalist in 2005 ... Named to the All-West Tennessee first team as a sophomore and junior ... Also selected All-West Tennessee Newcomer of the Year in 2003 ... Prior to senior year, named to HoopScoopOnline.com All-America team ... Rated No. 6 point guard in the nation by Scout.com ... Rivals.com ranked him the No. 46 player in the nation, No. 6 point guard in the country, and No. 4 player in Tennessee ... Played in Derby Festival Classic in April 2006 ... Had 13 points and eight assists in Memphis All-Star Classic in April 2006 ... Averaged 20.0 points, 4.0 rebounds and 7.0 assists as a junior.

College 
Kemp played his college basketball at the University of Memphis. He was part of Memphis Tigers team that made 2008 NCAA Finals.

06-07 
Played in all 37 games and started 36 ... Only missed start came on the Tigers' Senior Day (Clyde Wade started in his place) ... Averaged 6.4 points, 2.3 rebounds and 2.2 assists ... Shot 38.1 percent from the field, 38.6 percent from the three-point line and 41 percent from the free throw line

07-08 
Played in all 40 games, setting the school record for most games played in a single season (holds record with Chris Douglas-Roberts, Derrick Rose and Antonio Anderson) ... Came off bench as team's sixth man ... Averaged 5.0 points, 1.0 rebounds and 1.5 assists ... Had a 3:1 assist-to-turnover ratio (60 assists/20 turnovers) ... Averaged only 0.04 turnovers per minutes played (20 turnovers/552 minutes) ... Had only three games with two or more turnovers ... Recorded no turnovers in 24 games ... Was second on the team with 51 three-pointers made ... Shot 38.3 percent from the floor and 36.7 percent from the three-point arc

08-09 
Played in 36 of the Tigers' 37 games ... Made two starts ... Averaged 2.9 points, 0.9 rebounds and 1.2 assists ... Had one blocked shot and 33 steals ... Shot 28.3 percent from the floor and 63.6 percent from the free throw line

09-10 
Played in all 34 games and made 26 starts ... Played 1,033 minutes, the most for a single season in his career ... Posted career highs for a season for points (251), scoring average (7.4), assists (145), assists average (4.3) and steals (51) ... Shot a career-best (season) 38.5 percent from the field and 64.6 percent from the free throw line ... Shot 37.1 percent from the three-point arc ... Ranked among Conference USA leaders in assists (8th), steals (14th) and assist-to-turnover ratio (4th)

Professional 
In February 2014, he signed with BK Ventspils. At the end of the season he helped Ventspils to win Latvian Basketball League championship.

In August 2014, he signed with Trefl Sopot of Polish Basketball League.

In November 2016 he won the Arabian cup of the champions clubs with Etoile Sportive du Sahel (basketball).

The Basketball Tournament
Willie Kemp played for Team Memphis State in the 2018 edition of The Basketball Tournament. He averaged 3.5 points per game, 1.5 assists per game and 1.5 rebounds per game. Team Memphis State reached the second round before falling to Team DRC.

References

External links 
 Willie Kemp bio
 FIBA profile
 RealGM profile
 Yahoo.com profile

1987 births
Living people
African-American basketball players
American expatriate basketball people in Cyprus
American expatriate basketball people in Kosovo
American expatriate basketball people in Latvia
American expatriate basketball people in Poland
American expatriate basketball people in Romania
American expatriate basketball people in Slovakia
American men's basketball players
Basketball players from Tennessee
BK Ventspils players
Dakota Wizards players
Étoile Sportive du Sahel basketball players
KB Prishtina players
Keravnos B.C. players
Memphis Tigers men's basketball players
People from Bolivar, Tennessee
Point guards
Shooting guards
Trefl Sopot players
21st-century African-American sportspeople
20th-century African-American people